The Women's 200m Freestyle at the 2007 World Aquatics Championships took place on 27 March (prelims & semifinals) and 28 March (finals) at Rod Laver Arena in Melbourne, Australia.

The World Record in the event was lowered twice during the competition, first by Italy's Federica Pellegrini in semifinals, and then by France's Laure Manaudou in finals.

The existing records at the start of the competition were:
World Record (WR): 1:56.64, Franziska van Almsick (Germany), 3 August 2002 in Berlin, Germany.
Championship Record (CR): 1:56.78, Franziska van Almsick (Germany), Rome 1994 (Sep.6.1994).

Results

Final

Semifinals

Prelims

References

2007 Worlds results: Women's 200m free--Prelims from OmegaTiming.com (official timer of the 2007 World Championships); Retrieved 2009-07-02.
Worlds results: Women's 200m free--Semifinals from OmegaTiming.com (official timer of the 2007 World Championships); Retrieved 2009-07-02.
2007 Worlds results: Women's 200m free--Finals from OmegaTiming.com (official timer of the 2007 World Championships); Retrieved 2009-07-02.

Swimming at the 2007 World Aquatics Championships
2007 in women's swimming